The 1990 Gloucester City Council election took place on 1 May 1990 to elect members of Gloucester City Council in England.

Results  

|}

Ward results

Barnwood

Barton

Eastgate

Hucclecote

Kingsholm

Linden

Longlevens

Matson

Tuffley

Westgate

References

1990 English local elections
1990
1990s in Gloucestershire